Ectomyelois muriscis is a species of snout moth. It was described by Harrison Gray Dyar Jr. in 1914 and is widely distributed in Central America, northern South America, and the West Indian Archipelago.

The larvae feed within the pods of Theobroma cacao, Theobroma simiarum and other fruits.

References

Phycitini
Moths described in 1914